Ray Woodard is an American football player and coach.

Ray Woodard is also the name of:

Ray Woodard (soccer coach) (died 2009), Alabama soccer coach

See also
Woodard (disambiguation)